Three ships of the Argentine Navy have been named Rosales:

 , an  launched in 1890 and wrecked in a storm in 1892
 , the ex-American destroyer Stembel
 , an Espora-class corvette (type MEKO 140) currently in service with the Argentine Navy

Argentine Navy ship names